Estrane is a C18 steroid derivative, with a gonane core.

Estrenes are estrane derivatives that contain a double bond, with an example being nandrolone. Estratrienes (estrins) are estrane derivatives that contain three double bonds, for instance estrin (estra-1,3,5(10)-triene). The estrogen steroid hormones estradiol, estrone, and estriol are estra-1,3,5(10)-trienes.

See also
 Androstane
 Pregnane

References

Estranes